Toxabramis houdemeri is a species of ray-finned fish in the genus Toxabramis. It is found in China and Vietnam.

References

Toxabramis
Freshwater fish of China
Fish of Vietnam
Fish described in 1932